Gaspar Baldunciel (born 9 December 1996) is an Argentine rugby union player who plays for the Jaguares. On 28 December 2018, he was named in the Jaguares squad for the 2019 Super Rugby season.

References

External links
 itsrugby Profile

Jaguares (Super Rugby) players
Rugby union hookers
Argentine rugby union players
1996 births
Living people
Asociación Alumni players